WILN (105.9 FM, "Island 106") is a US commercial radio station located in Panama City, Florida.  WILN airs a Top 40 (CHR) music format.

History

WILN signed-on on April 21, 1985, at 9:20 AM with a small 6 kW signal on 106.3 MHz as WLVV "Love-FM", a Soft AC station geared toward women between 25 and 54. Due to a lack of listeners, the station was determined to be unsuccessful, and because of such, it ceased broadcast in the afternoon of October 31, 1987.

In the name of "bringing the fun back to radio", owners Jim and Bertie Broaddus decided to completely revamp the station, and "Island 106" (with a new callsign, WILN), came into being on November 2, 1987. To begin with, WILN played a Classic rock format, and went head to head with WFSY. In 1989, WILN upgraded to 50 kW and moved to the current 105.9 frequency. Over the next year, the format evolved from Classic Rock to a Rock-leaning Top 40 format, eventually shifting completely to the Mainstream Top 40/CHR format that has continued since 1990, competing against WPFM.

Since the sale of competitor WPFM to Educational Media Foundation in 2018, WILN is the Panama City area's only Top 40 radio station.

External links
Island 106 WILN official website

ILN
Contemporary hit radio stations in the United States
1985 establishments in Florida
Radio stations established in 1985